Vandalia was a plan by British investors in 1770 to occupy 2,500,000 acres of land and create a new colony in the Ohio Valley in North America.

Places

United States 
Vandalia, Illinois
Vandalia, Indiana
Vandalia, Michigan
Vandalia, Missouri
Vandalia, Montana
Vandalia, Ohio
Vandalia, West Virginia
Vandalia (colony), a proposed British colony along the Ohio River in the 1770s

Elsewhere 
A poetic name for Andalusia, since it was ruled by the Vandals
An imaginary place in Don Quixote

Other
USS Vandalia, four ships in the United States Navy
Vandalia Gathering, an annual festival in Charleston, West Virginia, United States

See also
Vandal Kingdom, established by the Germanic Vandal people
Vandalia Railroad (disambiguation)